Leslie Rae Bega (born April 17, 1967) is an American former actress.

Early life and education 
Bega was born in Los Angeles to a Sephardi Jewish father and Russian Jewish mother. Her paternal grandparents came to the United States from Spain. In addition to English, Bega speaks Spanish and French fluently. After graduating as valedictorian from Lycée Français de Los Angeles, Bega attended the University of Southern California.

Career 
Bega is known for performances in Head of the Class as Maria Borges, David Lynch's Lost Highway, and as a recurring cast member in CSI: Crime Scene Investigation, C-16: FBI and The Sopranos as Valentina La Paz. She is also featured as a dancer in the breakdancing films Breakin and Breakin' 2: Electric Boogaloo. She played the role of Anna Lansky (née Sitrone) in 1991's Mobsters.

She has appeared as a guest star in the television shows 21 Jump Street, Beverly Hills, 90210, The New Twilight Zone, and Highway To Heaven. Her theater work includes King Lear, at the Electric Theatre, The Merchant of Venice, Gypsy, Grease, The Sound of Music, and Maria in West Side Story at the Westchester Theatre.

Since retiring from acting, Bega has worked as a real estate agent in Beverly Hills, California.

Filmography

Film

Television

References

External links
 
 
 

American film actresses
American stage actresses
American television actresses
1967 births
Living people
Actresses from Los Angeles
20th-century American actresses
21st-century American actresses
American people of Russian-Jewish descent
American people of Spanish-Jewish descent

University of Southern California alumni
Lycée Français de Los Angeles alumni